"Hurt" is a song by American singer Christina Aguilera from her fifth studio album, Back to Basics. It was serviced to US contemporary hit radio stations on September 17, 2006, as the album's second single, and was released for purchase in November. Written by Aguilera, Linda Perry, and Mark Ronson, and produced by Perry, the song is a pop ballad with lyrics describing how the protagonist deals with the loss of a loved one and was inspired by the death of Perry's father.

"Hurt" received mixed-to-positive reviews from music critics, who praised Aguilera's vocals but were ambivalent towards the production. The song peaked at number 19 on the Billboard Hot 100 and was certified platinum by the Recording Industry Association of America (RIAA). According to Nielsen SoundScan, the single has sold over 1.1 million copies in the United States. It was a top-ten hit in Europe and Oceania, entering the top ten of record charts in countries including Austria, Belgium, France, Germany, Ireland, and Sweden.

A music video for the song was directed by Floria Sigismondi who had previously worked with Aguilera on the video for "Fighter". The video was also co-directed by Aguilera. It depicts Aguilera as a 1940s circus star who suffers from her father's death. It won two MVPA Awards for Best Video and Best Direction of a Female Artist in 2007, and was nominated for a Juno Award for Video of the Year. Aguilera has performed the song live on a number of occasions, including at the 2006 MTV Video Music Awards and on Saturday Night Live. The track was included on the setlist of Aguilera's Back to Basics Tour in 2006 and 2007.

Background and release 
Aguilera's fifth studio album, Back to Basics, which consists of two discs, was released in August 2006. The second disc, described by Aguilera herself as "a '20s, '30s vibe," was solely produced by her longtime collaborater–producer Linda Perry. During the recording session, Aguilera wanted to record a song about the pain of losing a loved one and asked Perry for help. Perry developed the idea while thinking about her father, who had died less than a year earlier. She revealed, "And she [Aguilera] came to me, and had these two chords that her and this guy wrote, and she was like 'I really like these chords, can you turn this into a song? I want the song to be about losing someone'. And inside of me, I'm going 'You little fucking bitch, you totally know I lost my dad, and now you're gonna milk my emotions.'"

"Hurt" was released as the second single from Back to Basics following the album's lead single "Ain't No Other Man", which was released in June 2006. The song was serviced to US contemporary hit radio stations on September 17, 2006. It was subsequently released physically in Australia, Germany, and the United Kingdom in November. An extended play consisting of remixes of the song was made available digitally onto iTunes Stores on November 21, 2006. In France, the single was released physically on January 8, 2007. "Hurt" was not initially planned to be released as the follow-up to "Ain't No Other Man"; instead, "Candyman" was taken into consideration by Aguilera. Nevertheless, RCA Records decided to release "Hurt" as the album's second single afterwards because the label thought that it would be a commercial success similar to Aguilera's previous ballad "Beautiful" (2002).

Composition

"Hurt" is a pop ballad that lasts for four minutes and three seconds. According to the music sheet published at Musicnotes.com by Alfred Publishing, "Hurt" is set in the key of E minor and has a moderate tempo of 72 beats per minute. Aguilera's vocals on the song range from the low note of G3 to the high note of E5. Its instrumentation comes from bass, cello, contrabass, drums, guitar, piano, viola and violin. It starts with a piano opening backed by strings and, as noted by Bill Lamb of About.com, "as the words work their way to a climax accented by percussion then gently fade away again leaving the listener in stunned silence from the beauty of the moment." Lyrically, "Hurt" is an evocation of pain and guilt that accompanies the loss of a loved one. Joan Anderman from The Boston Globe commented that "Hurt" resembles her previous song "Beautiful" (2002), while Lindsay Levan of News & Record considered it an "intensely personal tune." Chuck Taylor of Billboard deemed the song's lyrics as "moving past a relationship in ruins."

Critical reception

Chuck Taylor from Billboard praised the song's production and Aguilera's vocals, noting that the song gives, "testament to Aguilera's stupefying gifts as an emotive, mature powerhouse singer." Jody Rosen of Entertainment Weekly said that the song's "self-help bromides Aguilera delivers with melodrama that would make Barbra Streisand shudder." Writing for Newsday, Glenn Gamboa opined that Back to Basics would not be complete without "big" ballads like "Hurt", which was described as a "wrenching" song. Describing the song as "the centerpiece" of Back to Basicss second disc, About.com reviewer Bill Lamb gave the song a five out of five stars rating, commenting that the song "does not always fit easily into the typical pop radio, but it is a song that is very likely to generate significant listener requests.".

Naomi West writing for The Daily Telegraph named "Hurt" a "supersized" ballad, while Dan Gennoe from Yahoo! Music called it "over the top" (OTT). In a review for musicOMH, John Murphy named the song a "touching ode", but was not impressed with the "sugary-sweet" string arrangement that "overwhelms" the song. Judy Faber from CBS News shared that the second disc of the album did not bring back the 1920s and 1930s sound, particularly with the "overwrought weeper" "Hurt". Rolling Stone magazine's Jenny Eliscu called "Hurt" an "incongruous schmaltzfest," while Thomas Inskeep from Stylus Magazine named "Hurt" an "overblown" ballad. The song was deemed by AXS as Aguilera's best song.

Chart performance
In the United States, "Hurt" debuted at number 100 on the Billboard Hot 100 on the chart issue dated October 14, 2006. During the week of December 16, the single reached its peak at number 19 after spending ten weeks on the chart. The single peaked at number one the Hot Dance Club Songs, number six on the Adult Contemporary, and number ten on the Mainstream Top 40. It was certified platinum by the Recording Industry Association of America (RIAA) for shipments of over 1,000,000 units in the country. As of August 2014, "Hurt" has sold over 1,187,000 million digital copies in the US. In Canada, "Hurt" peaked at number 28 on the Canadian Singles Chart and was certified gold by the Music Canada for exceeding shipments of 40,000 copies there.

In the United Kingdom, "Hurt" peaked at number 11 on the UK Singles Chart for two consecutive weeks and spent 15 weeks on the chart. The song debuted at number four on the Ö3 Austria Top 40 chart, ultimately peaking at number two and spent a total of 27 weeks on the chart. "Hurt" peaked at number three in France, number two in Germany, and number one in Switzerland. It reached number one on the Portuguese Airplay Chart in March 2007, as reported by Nielsen Music Control. It was certified Gold by the Syndicat National de l'Édition Phonographique (SNEP), Gold in Germany, and in Switzerland.

Music video
Background
The music video for "Hurt" was shot over five days in September 2006. It was co-directed by Aguilera alongside Floria Sigismondi, who had previously directed the music video for "Fighter" (2003). The video's concept was described as circus-inspired. During the first day of filming, the big top tent where the video was shot was "blown away" because of strong wind, which resulted in a delay in shooting and a change of location. The video premiered on October 17, 2006 on MTV's Total Request Live. In an interview with The Gazette, Aguilera revealed,

I definitely had a story for it – a specific story – that's why I felt that it was important for her and I to co-direct this particular video and song and she completely got it. She got my vision for it. She [Sigismondi] got where I was trying to go and what she brings to the table is so incredible and she's so creative and outstanding. And I always have a great time working with her. There was no ego involved, you know, me - that was the first video that I'd ever stepped up to the plate to literally co-direct. I'd always been very opinionated and very you know, I always voice my ideas and whatnot in my videos, but this was the first one I actually took credit for in co-directing. And she was just so great and generous in teaching me some of the ropes and learning about the different camera angles and you know, all the facets and details that go into making a video. So, she was really great and we had such fun with that. [...]  And she's amazing. I can't you know, she came to the set dressed in different outfits that related to the circus everyday, so she's such an imaginative, creative spirit that I just have such fun working with energy like that.

Synopsis and reception

The video begins in black and white with the ending instrumental of "Enter the Circus"/"Welcome", over which a carnival barker (voiced by Linda Perry) introduces an audience to a circus. The transition to color begins when Aguilera appears in an old-fashioned dressing room, receiving flowers and then an important telegram saying, "In respect to inform you of the death of your father on the day of 02/09/1947." A flashback then shows a young Aguilera, played by Laci Kay, with her father, played by Timothy V. Murphy, raptured by the sight of the tightrope walker, played by Elizabeth Glassco. With her father's encouragement, Aguilera begins to train herself to do the same.

When the video switches to the real Aguilera, she is seen descending from the top of a circus tent on a rope, onto the back of an elephant, in pointe shoes and a structured jeweled outfit, with her father watching in the audience. She later attempts to greet him but is pulled away by fans and photographers. After being informed of the death of her father from the telegram and realizing that she was too wrapped up in her stardom to deal with what matters, she races through the circus in a belated attempt to find her father. Overwhelmed, Aguilera collapses on the ground and sees a silhouette of a man standing in front of the circus tent. Hoping the shadow figure to be her father, Aguilera holds out her hand with the elephant necklace on it to him. She breaks down crying when she realizes the silhouette has disappeared and that her father is gone. The video ends with a shot of Aguilera sitting on a circus box, singing and crying, before fading out to Aguilera's grief-stricken form on the ground outside the circus tent. The camera then zooms out and Aguilera is seen on the ground.

Michael Slezak from Entertainment Weekly commented that "the video actually makes me like the song more than I did when I heard it on its own." The video won two prizes at the 2007 MVPA Awards for Best Video and Best Direction of a Female Artist. It was also nominated for Video of the Year at the Juno Awards of 2007.

Live performances

Aguilera first performed the song at the MTV Video Music Awards on August 31, 2006; James Montgomery from MTV News named it one of the "high-gloss" moments of the event. Aguilera also promoted the song during the holiday season later that year, performing on the TV special Christmas at Rockefeller Center, aired by NBC on November 29, 2006. She sang the song on Saturday Night Live in November 2006. "Hurt" was included on the setlist of Aguilera's Back to Basics Tour in 2006 and 2007. For the performance of the song, she dressed in a plume outfit designed by Roberto Cavalli and sang while a giant crescent moon descended from the ceiling. The performance recorded during Aguilera's show in Adelaide, Australia in 2007 was included on the Back to Basics: Live and Down Under DVD release.

Track listings and formatsCD single "Hurt" – 4:03
 "Ain't No Other Man" (Shapeshifters Mixshow Mix) – 5:24CD maxi-single (premium) "Hurt" – 4:03
 "Hurt" (Jake Ridley remix) – 5:47
 "Ain't No Other Man" (Shapeshifters Mixshow Mix) – 5:24
 "Hurt" (Video) – 4:53Digital remix EP "Hurt" (Deeper-Mindset Tight Mix) – 7:04
 "Hurt" (Jack Shaft Main Mix) – 7:02
 "Hurt" (Chris Cox Club Anthem) – 9:56
 "Hurt" (JP & BSOD Electro Mix) – 6:01
 "Hurt" (Jonathan Peters Classic Mix) – 9:30
 "Hurt" (Jake Ridley Chillout Mix) – 5:47Japanese CD single"Hurt" – 4:03
"Hurt" (Jake Ridley remix) – 5:47
"Ain't No Other Man" (Shapeshifters Mixshow Mix) – 5:24
"Ain't No Other Man" (Junior Vasquez Club Mix) (Japanese bonus track) – 6:44European CD single "Hurt" (Album Version) – 4:03
 "Hurt" (Jake Ridley Mix) – 5:47
 "Ain't No Other Man" (Shapeshifters Mixshow Mix) – 5:24
 "Ain't No Other Man" (Video) – 3:47Digital download'''
"Hurt" – 4:03
"Hurt" (Jake Ridley Chillout Mix) – 5:47
"Ain't No Other Man" (Shape: UK Mixshow) – 5:24

Credits and personnel
Christina Aguilera – songwriter
Linda Perry – songwriter, producer, piano, audio engineer
Eric Schermerhorn –  guitar
Paul III – bass guitar
Nathan Wetherington – drums
Kristofer Kaufman – audio assistant
Peter Moktan – mixing
Seth Waldmann – mixing assistant
Sam Holland – mixing assistant

Credits and personnel are adapted from Back to Basics'' album liner notes.

Charts

Weekly charts

Year-end charts

Certifications

Release history

See also
 List of number-one dance singles of 2007 (U.S.)
 Tell Me (Diddy song)

Notes

References

2000s ballads
Christina Aguilera songs
Songs written by Christina Aguilera
Songs written by Linda Perry
Songs written by Mark Ronson
RCA Records singles
2006 singles
Pop ballads
European Hot 100 Singles number-one singles
Number-one singles in Switzerland
Music videos directed by Floria Sigismondi
Sony BMG singles
Songs about heartache
Songs inspired by deaths